The Long Beach Professional Building is a historic medical office building in downtown Long Beach, California added to the National Register of Historic Places in 2005.

The eight-story Art Deco two-part vertical block building with its pink and black lobby was built in 1929. It was designed by architect William Douglas Lee. It is particularly notable as the city's first large office building devoted exclusively to medicine.

It is also credited for introducing elements commonly found in the so-called "WPA Moderne" style of the 1930s.

In 2018 the building was re-opened by owners, Global Premier Development, and now operates under the name Regency Palms as an Assisted Living and Memory Care facility run by Meridian Senior Living. 

KTGY Architecture + Planning was responsible for the historic renovation.

See also
 List of City of Long Beach Historic Landmarks

References

External links
Information page at longbeach.gov
Copy of NRHP declaration at beachcalifornia.com

Downtown Long Beach
Office buildings completed in 1929
Buildings and structures in Long Beach, California
Commercial buildings on the National Register of Historic Places in California
Art Deco architecture in California
Landmarks in Long Beach, California
Buildings and structures on the National Register of Historic Places in Los Angeles County, California